Illovo Sugar Africa (Pty) Ltd based in  uMhlanga, KwaZulu-Natal, South Africa is Africa's largest sugar producer. The group produces raw and refined sugar for local, regional African, European Union (EU), United States and world markets from sugar cane supplied by its own agricultural operations and independent growers who supply cane to Illovo's factories. It is a subsidiary of Associated British Foods Plc., which purchased 51% of the issued share capital which for more than £400m in 2006. In 2016, ABF bought the remaining 49% of the share capital.

Illovo employs more than 12,000 permanent staff and 18,000 more on a temporary basis. Illovo Sugar's subsidiary Zambia Sugar is listed on the Lusaka Stock Exchange, under the symbol ZSUG. In addition, its Malawian subsidiary Illovo Sugar Malawi is listed on the Malawi Stock Exchange, under the symbol ILLOVO.

Subsidiaries
Subsidiaries of Illovo include:

Illovo Sugar South Africa based in Durban, South Africa
Illovo Sugar Malawi based in Limbe, Malawi
Kilombero Sugar in Tanzania
Maragra Açúcar based in Maputo, Mozambique
Ubombo Sugar of Eswatini (Swaziland)
Zambia Sugar based in Mazabuka, Zambia

References

External links
 
 Group profile from 2015 Annual Report

Associated British Foods
Companies based in KwaZulu-Natal
1891 establishments in the Colony of Natal
Companies listed on the Johannesburg Stock Exchange
Sugar companies of South Africa
eThekwini Metropolitan Municipality